The 2021 American Athletic Conference football season was the 30th NCAA Division I FBS Football season of the American Athletic Conference (The American). The season was the ninth since the former Big East Conference dissolved and became the American Athletic Conference and the eighth season of the College Football Playoff in place. The American was considered a member of the Group of Five (G5) together with Conference USA (C–USA), the Mid-American Conference (MAC), the Mountain West Conference and the Sun Belt Conference. The entire schedule was released on February 18, 2021.

Previous season
Cincinnati secured their second consecutive championship game appearance and faced Tulsa in the 2020 AAC Championship game.

Six teams participated in bowl games during the 2020 season; the league went 1–5.

Tulane lost to Nevada 38-27 in the 2020 Famous Idaho Potato Bowl. UCF lost to BYU in the Boca Raton Bowl 49-23. Memphis defeated Florida Atlantic 25–10 in the Montgomery Bowl. Houston lost to Hawaii 28-14 in the 2020 New Mexico Bowl. No. 24 Tulsa lost to Mississippi State 28-26 in the 2020 Armed Forces Bowl in a game that ended with a benches clearing brawl.

In the New Year's Six Game, No. 8 Cincinnati lost in an instant classic to No. 9 Georgia 24–21 in the Peach Bowl.

Preseason

Recruiting classes

American Athletic Conference Media Days
The 2021 American Media day was held virtually August 3 and 4, 2021

•2021 The American Virtual Football Media Days

Preseason media poll
The American Athletic Conference preseason media poll was released at the virtual media day held August 4, 2021. Cincinnati, who finished the 2020 season ranked No. 8 nationally, was tabbed as the preseason favorite in the 2021 preseason media poll.

Preseason awards

Head coaches

Coaching changes
On January 27, 2021 Josh Heupel departed UCF to Tennessee. Gus Malzahn was hired to serve as the new head coach on February 15, 2021.

Coaches
Note: All stats current through the completion of the 2021 regular season

Source:

Rankings

Schedule
The regular season will begin on September 2, 2021 and will end on November 27, 2021. The season will conclude with the 2021 American Athletic Conference Championship Game game on December 4.

At Media Day American Commissioner Mike Aresco said games will not be rescheduled this year because of COVID & if teams can’t play, they will have to forfeit

Regular season

Week One

Week Two

Week Three

Week Four

Week Five

Week Six

Week Seven

Week Eight

  This game was initially scheduled for ESPNU at 4PM ET, but moved to 9:20PM ET on ESPNews because of a rain delay..

Week Nine

Week Ten

Week Eleven

Week Twelve

Week Thirteen

Week Fourteen (American Athletic Conference Championship)

Week Fifteen

Postseason

Bowl games

In 2021 the American will send teams to the Military Bowl, Fenway Bowl, and Hawaii Bowl annually.  The American will have four selections from the following bowls:Frisco Bowl, Cure Bowl, Boca Raton Bowl, Gasparilla Bowl. Birmingham Bowl, First Responder Bowl and Myrtle Beach Bowl. The American champion will go to a New Year's Six bowl if a team finishes higher than the champions of Group of Five conferences in the final College Football Playoff rankings. American teams are also eligible for the College Football Playoff if they're among the top four teams in the final CFP ranking.

Cancelled bowls
The following bowl games tied in with the American Athletic Conference had their 2021 editions canceled :
  Memphis was originally slated to play in the Hawaii Bowl against Hawaii on December 24. Hawaii was forced to withdraw from the bowl game due to a shortage of available players, stemming from a combination of a COVID-19 outbreak within the team, players already out with injury, and players who transferred away from the school at the conclusion of the regular season.

  East Carolina was originally slated to play in the Military Bowl against Boston College on December 27. On December 26 the game was cancelled after Boston College had over 40 players unavailable to play in the Military Bowl against East Carolina. In a statement, Boston College said it did not have enough players to field a team because of coronavirus issues, season-ending injuries, opt-outs and transfers.

  SMU was originally slated to play in the Fenway Bowl against Virginia on December 29. Virginia was forced to withdraw game due to the number of COVID cases impacting its roster, preventing safe participation. As a result of this withdrawal, the game and associated activities will no longer take place

Rankings from Final CFP rankings. All times Eastern Time Zone. American teams bolded.

Selection of teams
Bowl-eligible (7): Cincinnati, East Carolina, Houston, Memphis, SMU, UCF, Tulsa
Bowl-ineligible: (4): Navy, South Florida, Temple, Tulane

American vs other conferences

American vs Power Five matchups 
The following games include American teams competing against Power Five conferences teams from the ACC, Big Ten, Big 12, BYU/Notre Dame, Pac-12 and SEC). All rankings are from the AP Poll at the time of the game.

American vs Group of Five matchups
The following games include American teams competing against teams from C-USA, MAC, Mountain West or Sun Belt.

American vs FBS independents matchups
The following games include American teams competing against FBS Independents, which includes Army, Liberty, New Mexico State, UConn or UMass.

American vs FCS matchups
The Football Championship Subdivision comprises 13 conferences and two independent programs.

Records against other conferences

Regular Season

Post Season

Awards and honors

Player of the week honors

American Athletic Individual Awards
The following individuals received postseason honors as chosen by the league's head coaches.

All-Conference Teams

* Denotes Unanimous Selection

All Conference Honorable Mentions:
UCF: Tatum Bethune (LB), Cole Schneider (OG), Marcus Tatum (OT)
Cincinnati: Marcus Brown (DL), Deshawn Pace (LB), Josh Whyle (TE)
Houston: Laine Wilkins (P)   
South Florida: Jaren Mangham (RB), Spenser Shrader (P)
SMU: Rashee Rice (WR)
Temple: C.J. Perez (C)
Tulane: Sincere Haynesworth (C), Dorian Williams (LB), Macon Clark (S)
Tulsa: Chris Paul (OG), Justin Wright (LB)

All-Americans

The 2021 College Football All-America Team is composed of the following College Football All-American first teams chosen by the following selector organizations: Associated Press (AP), Football Writers Association of America (FWAA), American Football Coaches Association (AFCA), Walter Camp Foundation (WCFF), Sporting News (TSN, from its historic name of The Sporting News), Sports Illustrated (SI), The Athletic (Athletic), USA Today (USAT) ESPN, CBS Sports (CBS), College Football News (CFN), Athlon Sports, Phil Steele, and Fox Sports (FOX).

Currently, the NCAA compiles consensus all-America teams using a point system computed from All-America teams named by coaches associations or media sources.  Players are chosen against other players playing at their position only.  To be selected a consensus All-American, players must be chosen to the first team on at least half of the five official selectors as recognized by the NCAA.  Second- and third-team honors are used to break ties.  Players named first-team by all five selectors are deemed unanimous All-Americans. Currently, the NCAA recognizes All-Americans selected by the AP, AFCA, FWAA, TSN, and the WCFF to determine consensus and unanimous All-Americans.

List of All American Teams
American Football Coaches Association All-America Team
Associated Press All-America Team
CBS Sports All-America Team
ESPN All-America Team
Football Writers Association of America All-America Team
The Athletic All-America Team
The Sporting News 2021 College Football All-America Team
USA Today All-America Team
Walter Camp Football Foundation All-America Team

National award winners

Home Depot Coach of the Year Award
Luke Fickell, Cincinnati

Eddie Robinson Coach of the Year
Luke Fickell, Cincinnati

Bobby Dodd Coach of the Year
Luke Fickell, Cincinnati

AFCA Coach of Year
Luke Fickell, Cincinnati

Bear Bryant Award
Luke Fickell, Cincinnati

Paul Hornung Award
Marcus Jones, Houston

Jim Thorpe Award
Coby Bryant, Cincinnati

Jet Award
Marcus Jones, Houston

NFL Draft

The following list includes all AAC players who were drafted in the 2022 NFL Draft.

References